Paul (Edmund) Schenk (11 February 1899 – 30 August 1977) was a German music theorist.

Life 
Born  in Leipzig, Schenk studied theory, composition and conducting at the University of Music and Theatre Leipzig, where he also received a teaching position for music theory from 1925. His studies with Sigfrid Karg-Elert, whose music theory Schenk accepted and propagated, were formative.

Immediately after their first electoral successes, Schenk joined the NSDAP and in his textbooks covered all the essential aspects of a "völkischen" music education.

In 1949 he was appointed professor for composition and ear training and headed the department of composition (music theory) at the Leipzig Academy of Music until his retirement in 1964. Schenk had a decisive influence on a whole generation of music theorists of the GDR.

Schenk died in his native town at the age of 78.

Writings 
 Sigfrid Karg-Elert: eine monographische Skizze mit vollständigem Werkverzeichnis. Leipzig 1927
 Lehrbuch der polaren Harmonik, Leipzig 1927
 Gehörbildungslehre. 8 issues, Trossingen 1951
 Schule des Blattsingens. Leipzig 1953
 Funktioneller Tonsatz. Arbeiten am Klavier. 2 vols., Leipzig 1953
 Allgemeine Musiklehre. Ergänzungs- und Fortbildungsband zu Hofmeisters Schulwerken für Musikinstrumente. Leipzig 1956
 Kleine praktische Harmonielehre. Leipzig 1976

Literature 
 Ludwig Holtmeier: Paul Schenk. In Ludwig Finscher (ed.): Die Musik in Geschichte und Gegenwart. Volume 14, Kassel 2005

References

External links 
 

1899 births
1977 deaths
German music theorists
Nazi Party members
Academic staff of the University of Music and Theatre Leipzig
Writers from Leipzig
20th-century German musicologists